The 2022 Idaho lieutenant gubernatorial election was held on November 8, 2022, to elect the next lieutenant governor of Idaho. It coincided with various other statewide races, including U.S. Senate, U.S. House, and governor. Idaho is one of 17 states that elect their lieutenant governor separately in both the primary and general elections.

Incumbent Republican Lieutenant Governor Janice McGeachin was first elected in 2018 with a plurality of 28.9% and 51,098 votes in a five-way primary then 59.7% and 356,507 votes in the general election. McGeachin had chosen not to run for reelection and instead unsuccessfully ran for governor in 2022.

The statewide primary was Tuesday, May 17, 2022.

Republican primary

Candidates

Nominee
Scott Bedke, speaker of the Idaho House of Representatives

Eliminated in primary
Dan Gasiorowski, former Planning and Zoning Commission chair of Boise County
Priscilla Giddings, state representative for Idaho's 7th legislative district

Endorsements

Polling

Results

Democratic primary

Candidates

Nominee
Terri Pickens Manweiler, attorney

Endorsements

Results

Constitution primary

Candidates

Nominee 
Pro-Life, organic strawberry farmer and Idaho perennial candidate

Results

See also

2022 Idaho gubernatorial election
Elections in Idaho

Notes

References

External links 
Official campaign sites
 Scott Bedke (R) for Lieutenant Governor
 Terri Pickens Manweiler (D) for Lieutenant Governor
 Pro-Life (C) for Lieutenant Governor

Idaho
Lieutenant Governor